Albert William "Al" Simmons,  (born September 5, 1948) is a Canadian children's performer from Anola, Manitoba.  He began performing in the 1970s and later made guest appearances on Fred Penner's television show as well as Sesame Street.  He tours regularly across Canada and the United States. He has recorded several albums for children and won a Juno Award in 1996.

Simmons worked as a gas jockey, steelworker and clerk before becoming an entertainer. He started performing in amateur shows and volunteering his services for benefit concerts. He formed a comedy/rock band called Out to Lunch and then a comedy/folk band, Kornstalk, before venturing out on his own again as a musician and prop comic. His best-known act was the Human Juke Box: "two bits a laff."

Simmons has released three CDs, Something's Fishy at Camp Wiganishie, Celery Stalks at Midnight, and The Truck I Bought From Moe, each of which won Parents' Choice honours and were nominated for Juno awards. Celery Stalks, an ode to vaudeville, won the 1996 Juno Award for Best Children's Album. His illustrated children's book Counting Feathers was short-listed for the McNally-Robinson Book of the Year in 1997. He received a Cable Ace Award nomination for his music video "I Collect Rocks," which is also the title track of his DVD. He also voiced the Genie Award-winning 1985 animated short, Get a Job.

In 1997, he wrote a song about Prince George, British Columbia mascot Mr. PG.

Al married Barbara Freundl in 1976. They have three sons, Karl, Will, and Brad.

References

External links
Al Simmons

Juno Award for Children's Album of the Year winners
Canadian children's musicians
Living people
Musicians from Winnipeg
Members of the Order of Manitoba
1948 births